

John Crawte (1763 – 7 October 1836) was an English cricketer who played as a left-handed batsman during the period between 1788 and 1807.

Crawte was born in Surrey and christened at Frensham in December 1763. He is known to have lived in the Alresford area of Hampshire and played for Alresford Cricket Club before he was persuaded to move to Kent by Stephen Amherst, a major patron of Kent matches, towards the end of the 18th century.

Crawte was considered a fine batsman who played David Harris, the best bowler of the era, better than any other player. He played in a total of 57 matches which are now considered to have first-class status between 1788 and 1803. He played 15 times in first-class matches for England sides, 14 for Surrey sides and 13 times for Kent teams as well as for combined teams and those organised by Kent patrons, including Richard Leigh and the Earl of Winchilsea. He continued to play non-first-class cricket for Kent sides, including for Rochester, into the early 1800s.

Crawte died in October 1836 at Boxley in Kent.

Notes

References

Bibliography
Birley D (1999) A Social History of English Cricket. London: Aurum Press. 
Pycroft J The Hambledon Club and the Old Players, in Lucas EV ed (1907) The Hambledon Men, p. 136, p. 142. London: Henry Frowde. (Available online at Wikisource. Retrieved 2022-03-20.)

External links

English cricketers
English cricketers of 1787 to 1825
Kent cricketers
1763 births
1836 deaths
People from the Borough of Waverley
Surrey cricketers
Left-Handed v Right-Handed cricketers
R. Leigh's XI cricketers
West Kent cricketers